The 2013 County Championship Plate, also known as Bill Beaumont Cup Division 2, was the 12th version of the annual English rugby union, County Championship organized by the RFU for the tier 2 English counties. Each county drew its players from rugby union clubs from the third tier and below of the English rugby union league system (typically National League 1, National League 2 South or National League 2 North). The counties were divided into two regional pools (north/south) with three teams in the north division and three in the south, with the winners of each pool meeting in the final held at Twickenham Stadium.  New teams to the division included Northumberland (north)) and North Midlands (south) who were relegated from the 2012 Bill Beaumont Cup. 

Both Northumberland and North Midlands would make an instant return to the 2014 Bill Beaumont Cup as they won their respective pools, with North Midlands having a more difficult time of it as they were run close by Somerset.  In the final at Twickenham, Northumberland proved to be a class apart, scoring six tries as they beat North Midlands 45–10 to claim their 4th title in the plate competition.

Competition format
The competition format involved six teams divided into two regional group stages of three teams each, divided into north and south, with each team playing each other once.  The top side in each group went through to the final held at Twickenham Stadium on 26 May 2013.

Participating Counties and ground locations

Group stage

Division 1 North

Round 1

Round 2

Round 3

Division 2 South

Round 1

Round 2

Round 3

Final

Total season attendances
Does not include final at Twickenham which is a neutral venue and involves teams from all three county divisions on the same day

Individual statistics
 Note if players are tied on tries or points the player with the lowest number of appearances will come first.  Also note that points scorers includes tries as well as conversions, penalties and drop goals.  Appearance figures also include coming on as substitutes (unused substitutes not included).  Statistics will also include final.

Top points scorers

Top try scorers

See also
 English rugby union system
 Rugby union in England

References

External links
 NCA Rugby

2013
2012–13 County Championship